Burnfield, located on the banks of the River Deveron in Aberdeenshire, Scotland, near Milltown of Rothiemay, is the site of a probable Roman marching camp, first discovered by aerial photography in 1982.

The area enclosed by the camp is not known but it covered at least  and the topography of the site makes it unlikely to have exceeded .

References

Bibliography
 
 
 

History of Aberdeenshire
Archaeological sites in Aberdeenshire
Roman fortified camps in Scotland